The Aur Island bent-toed gecko (Cyrtodactylus aurensis) is a species of gecko endemic to Aur Island in Malaysia.

References

Cyrtodactylus
Reptiles described in 2005